The Dark Dimension may refer to: 

 "The Dark Dimension", an unmade Doctor Who special to celebrate the series' 30th anniversary 
 Dark Dimension, home of Dormammu in the Marvel Comics universe
 Part I, issue 3 of the W.I.T.C.H. comic book series